Safet Babic (born 1981) is a German politician of Bosnian descent. He has been a candidate for the far-right National Democratic Party of Germany (NPD) in European, parliamentary, state assembly and local elections. 

Babic first came to prominence at the University of Trier where, as a law student, he was active in student politics for the NPD. From June 2009 till September 2011 he was member of the Trier city council.

References

1981 births
Living people
National Democratic Party of Germany politicians
German people of Bosnia and Herzegovina descent